Nancy S. Lacore (born in Albany, New York) is a rear admiral who serves as the 93rd commandant of Naval District Washington since June 10, 2022. She most recently served the director of the Maritime Partnership Program, U.S. Naval Forces Europe/Africa/U.S. 6th Fleet, with additional duties as vice commander of U.S. 6th Fleet in Naples, Italy.

Career 
She graduated in 1990 from the College of the Holy Cross with a Bachelor of Arts degree and received her commission from the Naval Reserve Officer Training Corps program.  She earned a Master of Arts from San Diego State University and is a graduate of the Air Command and Staff College, and the National Defense University at the Joint Forces Staff College.  She was designated a Naval Aviator in 1993.

Her flying tours include Helicopter Combat Support Squadrons 8 in Norfolk, Virginia and 3 in San Diego, California as well as Commander, Helicopter Tactical Wing Pacific.  She affiliated with the Navy Reserve in 2000.

Her staff assignments include Navy Reserve (NR) Naval Air Wings Pacific in San Diego, California, and NR Commander Amphibious Squadron 4 Detachment 104 in Bessemer, Alabama.  She served as the executive officer of NR Tactical Air Control Squadron 2186 and NR Commander Strike Force Training Atlantic, and as the chief staff officer for NR Commander 2nd Fleet Joint Force Air Component Commander, in Norfolk, Virginia.  She mobilized to serve as the chief of Key Leader Engagement at Headquarters, International Security Assistance Force in Kabul, Afghanistan, from 2011 to 2012.

Her command tours include NR Commander Destroyer Squadron 40 Headquarters in Jacksonville, Florida; NR Commander, U.S. Naval Forces Europe-Africa/U.S. 6th Fleet Maritime Partnership Program Detachment 413 in Detroit, Michigan, and NR U.S. Fleet Forces Command Maritime and Air Operations Headquarters in Norfolk, Virginia.  She served in a post-command assignment as the Navy Reserve chief staff officer at U.S. Fleet Forces in 2017, from which she mobilized to serve as the commanding officer, Camp Lemonnier, Djibouti.

Nancy Lacore was promoted to rear admiral (lower half) in 2018. She was promoted to rear admiral (upper half) on October 1, 2021. In March 2022, Lacore was reassigned as commandant of Naval District Washington, succeeding Michael Steffen. She assumed command on June 10, 2022.

Activities 
After returning from Afghanistan in 2012, she started volunteering for Wounded Wear, a Chesapeake-based nonprofit that helps families of service members who were killed or seriously injured. She later joined the organization's board.

She is known for awareness raising activities. In 2014, she established ‘Valor Knows No Gender: Run to Remember’: a 160-mile run, in 160 hours, for the 160 female veterans who died while serving in Iraq and Afghanistan. In 2018, she joined the Women's Panel Event in Djibouti, dedicated to Women's History Month and International Women's Day.

Awards 
Her personal awards include the Legion of Merit, Defense Meritorious Service Medal, Meritorious Service Medal, Navy Commendation Medal, Navy Achievement Medal, and other campaign and unit commendations.  She accumulated approximately 1300 flight hours in military aircraft.

Personal life 
Nancy Lacore is married and has 6 children, 5 daughters and a son.

References 

Living people
20th-century American naval officers
21st-century American naval officers
Female admirals of the United States Navy
Women United States Naval Aviators
United States Navy reservists
United States Navy personnel of the War in Afghanistan (2001–2021)
Recipients of the Legion of Merit
People from Albany, New York
College of the Holy Cross alumni
San Diego State University alumni
Year of birth missing (living people)
Recipients of the Meritorious Service Medal (United States)
20th-century American women
21st-century American women